Philipps House (until 1916 Dinton House) is an early nineteenth-century Neo-Grecian country house at Dinton, overlooking the Nadder valley about  west of Salisbury, Wiltshire, England. The house was built in 1816 by William Wyndham to the designs of Sir Jeffry Wyatville, replacing a 17th-century house. In 1916 the estate was bought by Bertram Philipps, who renamed the house after himself, then in 1943 gave the house and grounds to the National Trust. The is Grade II* listed and its parkland (known as Dinton Park is Grade II* on the Register of Historic Parks and Gardens.

The house is built of Chilmark stone, a local stone also used for Salisbury Cathedral, and Wyatt is believed to have based his design on Pythouse, some seven miles (11 km) away at Newtown, near Tisbury.  The house is two-storied with symmetrically set chimney stacks and a central lantern.  The main (south) front has nine bays with an Ionic portico.  The rooms are planned around a spacious square hall with an imperial staircase to the first floor.  The house is one of the first in England to have a central heating system installed, which was achieved by pumping hot air from a boiler in the basement into the stairwell.

History
The house was designed by Jeffry Wyatt, later Sir Jeffry Wyatville for William Wyndham (1769–1841), a descendant of Sir Wadham Wyndam, and was built between 1814 and 1817 on the site of an earlier, demolished seventeenth-century house, Dinton House, which had been the Wyndham family home since 1689.  It was sold in 1916 by William Wyndham (1868–1951) of Orchard Wyndham in Somerset, whose father William VI Wyndham (1834–1914), of Dinton House, had inherited Orchard Wyndham as heir male to his grandfather William IV Wyndham (1769–1841), of Dinton, under the will of his distant cousin George Francis Wyndham, 4th Earl of Egremont (1786–1845) (who shared common descent from Sir John Wyndham (1558–1645) of Orchard Wyndham).

In 1917 foreclosure proceedings were brought against Dinton House and its estate. The estate was bought by Bertram Erasmus Philipps (1870–1947), a descendant of the Philipps baronets of Picton Castle (1621 creation); who renamed the house after himself.  He was High Sheriff of Wiltshire in 1923.  Philipps and his wife, who had no children, annually hosted the pupils from the village school for a tea party at Philipps House with sports and fireworks.

In 1936, Philipps leased the house to the YWCA and moved to nearby Hyde's House, a former rectory which he had bought in 1924 and where he lived until his death. During World War II, the park in front of Philipps House was requisitioned for use by the United States Army Air Force, who erected a number of Nissen huts there.

National Trust 
Although the house and estate became the property of the National Trust, the property was handed over on the condition that it would continue to be leased to the YWCA, on a peppercorn rent, for as long as they had purposeful use for it. During their occupation the house was predominantly used as an artists' retreat, providing residential art courses for keen amateur and semi-professional painters.

Philipps House was much loved by many creative people during this era. The interior spaces were converted into artist studios with bedrooms available for paying guests. The grounds and outlying area also provided locations for landscape painting. Some of Britain's best contemporary artists such as Tom Coates, Edward Wesson, Ken Paine, Deborah Manifold, and John Yardley provided tuition, amongst others.

The YWCA remained at Philipps House until 1995. Despite the art courses being as heavily subscribed to as ever, the withdrawal of the YWCA was inevitable after the terms of the lease were changed when it was presented to the YWCA for renewal, a process that occurred every ten years. The lease transferred the cost of maintaining the structure of the house and other amenities from the National Trust to the YWCA at a time when many major works were due, such as laying new pipes from the neighbouring village of Dinton.

After the YWCA left, the National Trust carried out a thorough refurbishment of the house, which was leased to a tenant family. As of March 2023, the house remains closed to the public. The parkland that surrounds the house is still known as Dinton Park, and is accessible to the public.

References

Bibliography 
Anon, 1954, Philipps House, Dinton, Wiltshire: A Property of the National Trust, Curwen Press for the National Trust, 6 pages
James Lees-Milne, 1943, "Dinton House" Country Life 17 December 1943

External links 

National Trust: Philipps House and Dinton Park
"Dinton," Wiltshire Community History, Wiltshire Council – history, maps, and links concerning the civil parish of Dinton, along with the history of Philipps House and Dinton Park
"Phillips House", Art UK – images of paintings given to the National Trust by Bertram Philipps in 1943
Wikidata List of Paintings at Philipps House
Photos of Philipps House and Dinton Park
"Dinton House", Heritage Group of the Chartered Institution of Building Services Engineers, accessed 4 January 2013 – images, history, and floor plan of the house's original central heating system, said to be one of the first in the nation

Country houses in Wiltshire
National Trust properties in Wiltshire
Georgian architecture in Wiltshire
Grade II* listed buildings in Wiltshire
Grade II* listed houses
Historic house museums in Wiltshire
Jeffry Wyatville buildings
Wyndham family residences
Houses completed in 1816